Lyudmila Khazieva (3 November 1947 – 26 August 2018) was a Soviet swimmer. She won a bronze medal in the 400 medley event at the 1966 European Aquatics Championships, as well as six national titles between 1964 and 1966, mostly in medley events. She continued competing during the 1990s and won another national title in the masters category in 1992.

Khazieva was born in Kharkiv and graduated from the Kharkiv Polytechnic Institute. In Kharkiv she married the renowned Soviet water polo player Alexei Barkalov and changed her last name to Barkalova. They had a son Dmitri (1969–2001), also a competitive water polo player.

References

External links
Profile at Infosport.ru 

1947 births
Sportspeople from Kharkiv
Soviet female swimmers
Ukrainian female swimmers
Female medley swimmers
European Aquatics Championships medalists in swimming
Kharkiv Polytechnic Institute alumni
2018 deaths